Jack Alexander Stevens (born 2 August 1997) is an English professional footballer who plays as a goalkeeper for  club Port Vale, on loan from  club Oxford United. He spent time in the youth-teams at Chelsea, Barnet and Reading, before turning professional at Oxford United in April 2016. He was loaned out to Cirencester Town, Tamworth and Port Vale.

Career
Stevens spent time in the youth teams at Chelsea and Barnet, but was rejected by both clubs due to his small stature. He attended the John Madejski Academy, a school associated with Reading. He then underwent a growth spurt and joined the youth team at Oxford United in 2014, before being given a 12-month professional contract in April 2016. Manager Michael Appleton said that he had "worked very hard". This followed from a brief youth loan spell at Southern League Premier Division club Cirencester Town, where he made his senior debut in a 2–0 defeat at King's Lynn Town on 23 January 2016, and also played in a 5–2 home defeat to St. Neots Town seven days later.

On 5 August 2016, Stevens joined Oxford City of the National League South on a youth loan deal. He played seventeen games before being recalled on 11 November in order to provide cover at United whilst Benjamin Büchel was on international duty. On 24 August 2017, Stevens returned to Oxford City on loan after manager Pep Clotet brought in Scott Shearer to act as backup to Simon Eastwood. He played nineteen league and three FA Cup games, before being recalled from his loan on 9 January due after Eastwood picked up an injury. He was an unused substitute in the 2017 final of the EFL Trophy at Wembley Stadium, where Oxford were beaten 2–1 by Coventry City.

On 19 January 2018, Stevens joined Tamworth on a one-month loan deal. In March 2018, Stevens signed a new contract with Oxford United to keep him at the club until the summer of 2019; caretaker-manager Derek Fazackerley described him as "very much as one for the future". He played fifteen National League North matches as Tamworth were relegated in 21st-place.

He made his debut for Oxford United in a 2–1 win over Charlton Athletic on 19 April 2019, coming on as a substitute in the 54th-minute after Eastwood had been sent off; the Oxford United website described how he made a "miracle save" as the game drew to a close. He started the 3–2 win at Shrewsbury Town three days later, before dropping to the bench as Eastwood was restored to the starting eleven. He signed a one-year contract extension in March 2020 after impressing towards the end of the 2019–20 season.

Stevens earned a start against Ipswich Town at the Kassam Stadium on 1 December 2020 and kept a clean sheet in a 0–0 draw. On 2 April 2021, police were called to the Stadium of Light after Stevens was allegedly headbutted at half-time during Oxford United’s 3–1 defeat to Sunderland. The club later confirmed that they would not be pursuing further police action. He ended the 2020–21 season with 40 appearances to his name, helping Oxford to a sixth-place finish and a play-off semi-final defeat to Blackpool. He was named as the club's Young Player of the Year. He featured 30 times in the 2021–22 campaign as Oxford posted an eighth-place finish. He missed three months of the season after suffering a severe bout of glandular fever.

On 11 August 2022, Stevens signed a contract extension with Oxford United until the summer of 2025. The same day, he was loaned to League One rivals Port Vale until the end of the 2022–23 season, as United manager Karl Robinson looked to play new signing Edward McGinty. Vale manager Darrell Clarke started Stevens ahead of the club's number one Aidan Stone in the goalless draw with Bolton Wanderers at Vale Park just two days later.

Career statistics

Honours
Oxford United
EFL Trophy runner-up: 2017

References

External links
 Oxford United Profile

1997 births
Living people
Footballers from Ealing
English footballers
Association football goalkeepers
Chelsea F.C. players
Barnet F.C. players
Reading F.C. players
Oxford United F.C. players
Cirencester Town F.C. players
Oxford City F.C. players
Tamworth F.C. players
Port Vale F.C. players
Southern Football League players
National League (English football) players
English Football League players